is a passenger railway station located in the city of Bizen, Okayama Prefecture, Japan, operated by the West Japan Railway Company (JR West).

Lines

Station layout
The station consists of one ground-level island platform located on an embankment. The station building is located directly on the platform, which is connected to the road by stairs and a level crossing. The station is unattended.

Platforms

History
Mitsuishi Station was opened on 1 December 1890. With the privatization of Japanese National Railways (JNR) on 1 April 1987, the station came under the control of JR West.

Passenger statistics
In fiscal 2019, the station was used by an average of 174 passengers daily

Surrounding area
Bizen City Mitsuishi Branch Office
Bizen Municipal Mitsuishi Junior High School
Bizen Municipal Mitsuishi Elementary School

See also
List of railway stations in Japan

References

External links

 JR West Station Official Site

Railway stations in Okayama Prefecture
Sanyō Main Line
Railway stations in Japan opened in 1890
Bizen, Okayama